Lewis Spitz  (born 25 August 1939 in Pretoria) is a paediatric surgeon who is internationally recognised as a leader in paediatric surgery and is known for his work on congenital abnormalities of the oesophagus, particularly oesophageal atresia, oesophageal replacement and gastroesophageal reflux especially in neurologically impaired children. He championed the plight of children with cerebral palsy and other congenital disorders; demonstrating that appropriate surgery could improve their quality of life. He is the leading authority in the management of conjoined twins and is recognised as the foremost international expert in this field. Spitz is the Emeritus Nuffield Professor of Paediatric Surgery.

Life
Spitz undertook his early education, at the Christian Brothers' College in Pretoria.  Spitz's clinical training took place at Pretoria University, graduating in 1962, which a Bachelor of Medicine, Bachelor of Surgery. His post clinical training as a house officer was taken at Baragwanath and Johannesburg Academic Hospitals, and other South African teaching hospitals under the direction of D.J. du Plessis.

Career
In 1970, Spitz travelled from South Africa to the United Kingdom for additional training at Alder Hey Children's Hospital and Great Ormond Street Hospital, through a Smith & Nephew Foundation grant. After two years, Spitz returned to South Africa and was appointed to the Chris Hani Baragwanath Hospital as a consultant in paediatric surgery. In 1973, Spitz took a position at the Transvaal Memorial Hospital for Children in Johannesburg and was promoted to Senior Specialist,

In 1974, Spitz was appointed consultant paediatric surgeon at The Children's Hospital, Sheffield, becoming Senior Consultant in 1977.

In 1979, Spitz was appointed to a combined position of Consultant in the surgery department and Nuffield Professor of Paediatric Surgery at the Institute of Child Health, Great Ormond Street Hospital. He built up the department to one of the top 5-10 units internationally.

Societies
 Fellow of the Royal College of Surgeons of Edinburgh, 1969
 Honorary Fellow of the Royal College of Surgeons in Ireland, 2005
 Honorary Fellow of the American College of Surgeons, 2012
 Spitz is also an Honorary Fellow of the Colleges of Medicine of South Africa.

Awards and honours
In 2002, Spitz was awarded the Clement Price Thomas Award, named after Clement Price Thomas, In recognition of his outstanding contributions to treatment of conjoined twins. In 2002, Spitz was also awarded an honorary doctorate by the University of Sheffield. In 2004, Spitz was awarded Denis Browne Gold Medal, named after the surgeon Denis Browne, who was the first president of the British Association of Paediatric Surgeons and was notable for being the first paediatric surgeon, within the United Kingdom. In 2004, he was awarded the James Spence Medal. In 2010, Spitz was awarded the Rehbein Medal by the European Paediatric Surgeons' Association for outstanding contributions to the development of paediatric Surgery. In 2012, Spitz was awarded the American Ladd Medal, the highest award of the surgical section of the American Academy of Pediatrics.

Spitz was also awarded the Sulamaa Medal from the Finnish Association of Pediatric Surgery, and as an expert visitor, Spitz gave the coveted Sulamaa Lecture.

Bibliography
The following journal articles, written or co-edited by Spitz, have high citation counts, i.e. above one hundred.

 
 
 
 
 
 
 
 
 
 
 
 

The following books were co-authored by Spitz.

 Pediatric Surgical Oncology., Lewis Spitz; Peter Wurnig; Thomas A Angerpointner. Berlin,Heidelberg : Springer Berlin Heidelberg, 1989.
 A colour atlas of surgery for undescended testes., Lewis Spitz. London : Wolfe Medical Books, 1984.
 Surgery in solitary kidney and corrections of urinary transport disturbances., Lewis Spitz; Peter Wurnig; Thomas Angerpointer. Berlin : Springer Verlag, 1989.

References

1939 births
People from Pretoria
South African paediatric surgeons
Living people